Noel Mitten was an Irish footballer during the 1970s.

He won a league winners medal with Bohemians in 1974/75 and was Bohemian's top scorer that season with 8 goals in 16 league games. Mitten scored in the 1974/75 League Cup final against Finn Harps and also netted in the replay. He made 5 appearances in European competition for Bohemians scoring in the 1976-77 European Cup Winners' Cup at Esbjerg fB. A former Manchester United trainee from 1972 to 1973, he later emigrated to Australia. Mitten's clubs in Australia included Frankston City, Essendon Croatia, Morwell Falcons, Maribyrnong Polonia and Sunshine George Cross FC.

For several years Mitten was head football (soccer) coach at Wesley College, Melbourne.

Honours

Club
Bohemians
League of Ireland (1): 1974–75
FAI Cup (1): 1976
League of Ireland Cup (1): 1975

References

1957 births
Living people
Republic of Ireland association footballers
League of Ireland players
National Soccer League (Australia) players
Bohemian F.C. players
Gippsland Falcons players
Manchester United F.C. players
Melbourne Knights FC players
South Melbourne FC players
Caroline Springs George Cross FC players
Western Eagles FC players
Association footballers not categorized by position